Eriochloa sericea is a species of grass known by the common name Texas cupgrass. It is native to Nebraska, Kansas, Oklahoma, and Texas in the United States and to northern Mexico.

This perennial grass grows up to 3.5 feet tall and forms tufts.

In the wild this grass grows on prairies on rocky, loamy soils.

This is a good grass for grazing livestock. It withstands moderate grazing pressure but not overgrazing.

References

External links
USDA Plants Profile
NatureServe

Panicoideae